The 1951 Railway Cup Hurling Championship was the 25th series of the inter-provincial hurling Railway Cup. Three matches were played between 18 February 1951 and 17 March 1951 to decide the title. It was contested by Connacht, Leinster, Munster and Ulster.

Munster entered the championship as the defending champions.

On 17 March 1951, Munster won the Railway Cup after a 4-09 to 3-06 defeat of Leinster in the final at Croke Park, Dublin. It was their 19th Railway Cup title overall and their fourth title in succession.

Leinster's Shem Downey was the Railway Cup top scorer with 5-02.

Results

Semi-finals

Final

Top scorers

Overall

Single game

Sources

 Donegan, Des, The Complete Handbook of Gaelic Games (DBA Publications Limited, 2005).

References

Railway Cup Hurling Championship
Railway Cup Hurling Championship